The office of High Sheriff of Somerset is an ancient shrievalty which has been in existence since the 11th century. Originally known as the "Sheriff of Somerset", the role was retitled on 1 April 1974, under the provisions of the Local Government Act 1972.

The position of Sheriff was once a powerful one, the holders being responsible for collecting taxes and enforcing law and order in Somerset, a county in South West England. In modern times the sheriff has become a ceremonial officer of the Crown, attending or presiding over many public events. Until 1567 the Sheriff of Somerset was also Sheriff of Dorset.

In England, Wales, and Northern Ireland the high sheriff is theoretically the Sovereign's judicial representative in the county, while the Lord Lieutenant is the Sovereign's personal representative. Their jurisdictions, the "shrieval counties", are no longer co-terminous with administrative areas, representing a mix between the ancient counties and more recent local authority areas. The post is unpaid, except for a small court attendance allowance, and the general expenses of the office are borne personally by the holder. Eligibility for nomination and appointment of High Sheriffs is controlled by the Sheriffs Act of 1887.

Sheriffs of Somerset 11th century
c1061 Godwine
1066-1068 Tovid or Tofig
1083-1086 William de Moyon

Sheriffs of Somerset and Dorset

11th and 12th century

13th century

14th century

oooo

15th century

16th century

Sheriffs of Somerset

16th and 17th century

18th century

19th century

20th century

High Sheriff of Somerset

20th century

21st century

References

 
Somerset
History of Somerset
Local government in Somerset
High Sheriffs